The Coppa d'Oro di Milano is a Listed flat horse race in Italy open to thoroughbreds aged four years or older. It is run over a distance of 3,000 metres (about 1⅞ miles) at Milan in May.

History
The event was formerly classed at Group 3 level. For a period it was restricted to horses aged four or older. The minimum age was lowered to three in 1995. It was run as an ungraded handicap from 1996 to 2002.

The Coppa d'Oro di Milano reverted to being a conditions race in 2003. From this point it held Listed status. It was closed to three-year-olds in 2007.

The race is currently staged at the same meeting as the Oaks d'Italia.

Records
Most successful horse since 1987 (2 wins):
 Drum Taps – 1992, 1993
 Pay Me Back – 1997, 1998
 Montalegre – 2006, 2007
 Caudillo - 2012, 2013
 Trip To Rhodes - 2014, 2016

Leading jockey since 1987 (4 wins):
 Sergio Dettori – Damascus Regal (1988), Steve Lucky (1996), Pay Me Back (1997, 1998)

Leading trainer since 1987 (4 wins):
 Bruno Grizzetti – Jar (1999), London Bank (2001), Storm Mountain (2009), Frankenstein (2011)

Winners since 1987

See also
 List of Italian flat horse races

References
 Racing Post / www.labronica.it:
 1999, 2000, 2002, 
 galopp-sieger.de – Coppa d'Oro di Milano.
 pedigreequery.com – Coppa d'Oro di Milano – Milano San Siro.

Open long distance horse races
Sport in Milan
Horse races in Italy